Cokendolpherius is a genus of hubbardiid short-tailed whipscorpions, first described by Luis de Armas in 2002.

Species 
, the World Schizomida Catalog accepts the following two species:

 Cokendolpherius jumagua Teruel & Rodriguez, 2010 – Cuba
 Cokendolpherius ramosi Armas, 2002 – Cuba

References 

Schizomida genera